The 1942–43 Holy Cross Crusaders men's basketball team represented The College of the Holy Cross during the 1942–43 NCAA men's basketball season. The head coach was Albert Riopel, coaching the crusaders in his first season. The team finished with a final record of 1–5.

Schedule

|-

References

Holy Cross Crusaders men's basketball seasons
Holy Cross